The Park Tower Knightsbridge Hotel is a luxury 5-star hotel in London, England. It is situated at 101 Knightsbridge near Hyde Park, in the Belgravian district of the Royal Borough of Kensington and Chelsea.

History
The hotel was designed by Richard Seifert and was officially opened on 21 June 1973 as the Park Tower Hotel by Prime Minister Edward Heath. It has a close similarity to the tower of Elmbank Gardens, an office block in Glasgow which Seifert's practice designed around the same period. Sheraton Hotels acquired the management contract for the Park Tower, along with the Skyline Hotel at Heathrow Airport, from Canadian-based Skyline Hotels on May 14, 1977, and the hotel was renamed the Sheraton Park Tower.

When Starwood acquired Sheraton, they moved the hotel from their Sheraton division to The Luxury Collection, but somewhat confusingly kept the Sheraton name on the hotel for many years. The hotel was finally renamed in 2013, for its 40th anniversary, becoming The Park Tower Knightsbridge. It is owned by Mahdi Al Tajir, an Emirati businessman and former diplomat.

References

External links

Hotels in London
Richard Seifert buildings
Knightsbridge
Hotel buildings completed in 1973
1973 establishments in England
The Luxury Collection